

International competition

National Team tournaments
2023 World Baseball Classic (Mar)
U-12 Baseball World Cup (July)
European Baseball Championship (Sep)

Club team tournaments
2023 Caribbean Series: Tigres del Licey
European Cup (Aug)

North American domestic leagues
Major League Baseball 

Minor League Baseball
Triple–A
Double–A
High–A
Single–A
Rookie
Fall League
MLB Partner Leagues
College Baseball
2023 College World Series
Division II
Division III
NAIA
Junior College World Series
Division I
Division II
Division III
Little League

Other domestic leagues

Summer leagues

Winter leagues
Australian Baseball League: Adelaide Giants
Colombian League: Vaqueros de Montería
Cuban Elite League:  Agricultores
Dominican League: Tigres del Licey
Mexican Pacific League: Cañeros de Los Mochis
Nicaraguan League: Indios del Bóer
Panamanian League: Federales de Chiriquí
Puerto Rican League: Indios de Mayagüez
Venezuelan League: Leones del Caracas

Awards

Major League Baseball

Events

January
 January 24: The results of the Baseball Writers' Association of America's voting for the 2023 Hall of Fame induction class were announced. Scott Rolen was the only candidate elected.
January 28: Baseball Writers Association Dinner returns after a 2-year hitaus due to COVID-19 pandemic.

February
February 15: Pitchers and catchers report to spring training
February 17: The 2023 NCAA Division I baseball season begins
February 20: Spring Training begins for other MLB Players
February 24: Spring Training Begins for a few teams
February 25: Spring Training Begins for all teams

March
March 8–21: 2023 World Baseball Classic
March 28: Spring Training ends
March 30: 2023 Major League Baseball season begins

April
April 6: Opening Day for All Minor League Teams
April 15: Jackie Robinson Day

May
May 14: Mother's Day
May 29: Memorial Day

June
June 16–27: 2023 College World Series
June 18: Father's Day

July
July 4: Independence Day
July 11: 2023 MLB All-Star Game at T-Mobile Park in Seattle, Washington
July 23: Induction Ceremonies for the National Baseball Hall of Fame and Museum in Cooperstown, New York

August
August 1: (6p.m. ET) Trading Deadline
August 17–27: The 2023 Little League World Series will be held in South Williamsport, Pennsylvania
August 31: MLB's postseason-eligible deadline for players acquired via waiver claim

September
September 1: MLB active rosters expand from 26 to 28 players
September 4: Labor Day
September 15: Roberto Clemente Day

October
October 1: End of the Major League Baseball Regular season

Postseason
October 3: American League Wild Card Series And National League Wild Card Series begins
October 7: American League Division Series and National League Division Series begins
October 14: American League Championship Series begins
October 15: National League Championship Series begins
October 24: 2023 World Series begins

November
November 1: Game 7 of the 2023 MLB World Series (if necessary).
Immediately after World Series: Eligible players become free agents.
Second day after the World Series: Trading window opens.
Fifth day after the end of the World Series: Deadline for clubs to make qualifying offers to their eligible players who become free agents.
Sixth day after the end of the World Series: First Day of free agents may sign contracts with a club other than a former club.
12th day after the end of the World Series: Last day for article xx (B) free agents to accept a qualifying offer from a former club (midnight EST).

December
December 4–7: Winter Meetings
December 7: Rule 5 Draft

Deaths

January
January 2 – Cliff Gustafson, 91, Hall of Fame coach at the University of Texas for 29 years who took the team to the College World Series 17 times, capturing titles in 1975 and 1983.
January 5 – Nate Colbert, 76, All-Star first baseman for the Padres and four other teams who holds San Diego's career record of 163 home runs; had the first 100-RBI season in San Diego history, driving in 111 runs in 1972.
January 5 – Carl Duser, 90, pitcher who made three appearances for the Kansas City Athletics in 1956 and 1958; earned win in 1958 Caribbean Series before career-ending car crash later that year.
January 6 – Bill Campbell, 74, All-Star relief pitcher for seven teams from 1973 to 1987 who picked up 17 wins and 20 saves for 1976 Twins, led American League with 31 saves with 1977 Red Sox.
January 12 - Lee Tinsley, 53, outfielder for three teams, primarily the Red Sox, who was the center fielder for Boston's 1995 division champions; later a coach for three clubs.
January 13 - Bill Davis, 80, first baseman for the Indians and Padres between 1965 and 1969 who started  the first major league game in San Diego history; named the Pacific Coast League's Top Prospect in 1965.
January 15 - Ted Savage, 85, outfielder for eight teams between 1962 and 1971 who batted .279 with 12 home runs for the 1970 Brewers; MVP of the International League in 1961.
January 16 - Frank Thomas, 93, All-Star outfielder and third baseman for seven National League teams who drove in 100 runs twice for Pirates, hit 20 home runs nine times with four different clubs; led 1962 expansion Mets with 34 home runs and 94 RBI.
January 19 - Bert Peña, 63, Puerto Rican shortstop for the Astros, usually as a defensive replacement; drove in 60 runs three times with the Tucson Toros, later managed the Puerto Rican national team.
January 20 - Sal Bando, 78, 4-time All-Star third baseman for the A's and Brewers who was MVP runner-up for Oakland's 1971 division champions, becoming team captain on three straight World Series champions; led AL in doubles and total bases in 1973, hit 20 home runs six times and drove in 100 runs twice; later served as Milwaukee's general manager.
January 23 - Hiromitsu Kadota, 74, Japanese Hall of Fame outfielder whose 567 career home runs, most for the Nankai Hawks, rank third in the history of Nippon Professional Baseball; won MVP Award at age 40.
January 26 - Gary Peters, 85, All-Star pitcher who won 124 games for the White Sox and Red Sox, was 1963 Rookie of the Year after winning 19 games for Chicago; won 20 games in 1964, led AL in ERA twice; noted for strong hitting with 19 home runs, batting as high as .271.
January 30 - John Adams, 71, Indians superfan known for playing a bass drum in the stands for nearly every home game for 47 years beginning in 1973.
January 31 - Dave Elder, 47, relief pitcher for the Indians in 2002 and 2003.

February
February 2 - Ron Campbell, 82, infielder who played 52 games with the Cubs from 1964 to 1966, batting .272 in his September 1964 debut; hit .313 with 1963 Amarillo Gold Sox.
February 4 - Pete Koegel, 75, catcher and infielder with the Brewers and Phillies from 1970 to 1972; batted .309 with 1971 Eugene Emeralds, set Venezuelan League record with 65 RBI in 1974.
February 4 - Ron Tompkins, 78, relief pitcher with the 1965 Kansas City A's and 1971 Cubs who led the 1972 Wichita Aeros with 20 saves.
February 10 - Satoshi Iriki, 55, Japanese pitcher who was 10-3 with the 2001 Japan Series champion Yakult Swallows.
February 12 - Brian DuBois, 55, pitcher for the 1989-1990 Tigers who was 12-4 with the 1988 Hagerstown Suns.
February 16 - Alex Herrera, 43, Venezuelan relief pitcher for the Indians in 2002 and 2003.
February 16 - Tim McCarver, 81, All-Star catcher, mostly with the Cardinals and Phillies, who led NL in triples in 1966, helped lead St. Louis to 1967 World Series title; went on to 40-year broadcasting career, winning Ford C. Frick Award and multiple Emmy Awards.
February 21 - Albie Pearson, 88, All-Star center fielder for three AL teams who was Rookie of the Year with 1958 Senators; led league in runs with 1962 Angels, then batted .304 in 1963.
February 22 - Román Mejías, 97, Cuban outfielder, primarily with the Pirates, who led the 1962 expansion Houston Colt .45s in most offensive categories, including 24 home runs and 76 RBI.
February 25 - Dave Nicholson, 83, left fielder for four teams who hit 22 home runs for 1963 White Sox; hit 30 home runs twice in minor leagues, including 34 for 1968 Richmond Braves.
February 26 - Sandy Valdespino, 84, Cuban left fielder for the Twins and four other clubs who batted .261 as a rookie for Minnesota's 1965 pennant winners; won batting titles in Cuban Winter League's final season in 1961 and International League in 1964.
February 28 - Jean Faut, 97, All-Star pitcher in the All-American Girls Professional Baseball League whose 140 wins ranked second in league history; won Triple Crown twice, led league in strikeouts three times, pitched four no-hitters including a pair of perfect games.

See also

2023 Major League Baseball season

References

External links
Major League Baseball official website